Nonattachment, non-attachment, or detachment is a state in which a person overcomes their emotional attachment to or desire for things, people or worldly concerns and thus attains a heightened perspective. It is considered a wise virtue and is promoted in various Eastern religions, such as Hinduism, Jainism, Taoism and Buddhism. It is also a key concept in Christian spirituality (often referred to by the Greek term apatheia), where it signifies a detachment from worldly objects and concerns.

Importance of the term
Detachment as release from desire and consequently from suffering is an important principle, or even ideal, in Buddhism, Hinduism, Jainism, Stoicism, Taoism and Baháʼí Faith.

In Buddhist and Hindu religious texts the opposite concept is expressed as upādāna, translated as "attachment". Attachment, that is the inability to practice or embrace detachment, is viewed as the main obstacle towards a serene and fulfilled life. Many other spiritual traditions identify the lack of detachment with the continuous worries and restlessness produced by desire and personal ambitions.

Jainism
Detachment is one of the supreme ideals of Jainism, together with non-violence. Non-possession/non-attachment is one of the Mahavratas, the five great vows Jain monks observe. Detachment is meaningful if accompanied by the knowledge of self as a soul; moreover, it can serve as the means for attaining self realization. According to Jain saint Shrimad Rajchandra, for those who are lifeless ritualists, mere bodily restraint does not become helpful in attaining self-realization — detachment and such other attributes are the requisites for attaining it. Therefore, he suggests one should undertake such activities, but one must not get stuck there. One cannot get rid of the root cause of birth and death without self-realization. As such, a Jain must understand and apply detachment for the purpose of gaining realization. However, he states that if one bears hardships that do not lead to a reduction in defilement, one becomes strayed from the path to liberation.

Baháʼí Faith

The second definition is in the Words of Wisdom:

Buddhism

Regarding the concept of detachment, or non-attachment, Buddhist texts in Pali mention nekkhamma, a word generally translated as "renunciation". This word also conveys more specifically the meaning of "giving up the world and leading a holy life" or "freedom from lust, craving and desires."

The writings of Milarepa are canonical Mahayana Buddhist texts that emphasize the temporary nature of the physical body and the need for non-attachment.

Detachment is a central concept in Zen Buddhist philosophy. One of the most important technical Chinese terms for detachment is "wú niàn" (無念), which literally means "no thought." This does not signify the literal absence of thought, but rather the state of being "unstained" (bù rán 不染) by thought. Therefore, "detachment" is being detached from one's thoughts. It is to separate oneself from one's own thoughts and opinions in detail as to not be harmed mentally and emotionally by them.

Christianity
Eastern Christian monasticism cultivated practices of detached watchfulness which were designed to calm the passions and lead to an ongoing state of calm detachment known as apatheia. 

In Western Christianity, Ignatian spirituality encourages detachment, sometimes referred to as indifference, in order to maximize a person's availability to God and to their neighbors.

Hinduism
The Hindu view of detachment comes from the understanding of the nature of existence and the true ultimate state sought is that of being in the moment. In other words, while one is responsible and active, one does not worry about the past or future. The detachment is towards the result of one's actions rather than towards everything in life. This concept is cited extensively within Puranic and Vedic literature, for example:

Vairagya is a Hindu term which is often translated as detachment.

Taoism
The Tao Te Ching expressed the concept (in chapter 44) as:
Fame or Self: Which matters more?
Self or Wealth: Which is more precious?
Gain or Loss: Which is more painful?
He who is attached to things will suffer much.
He who saves will suffer heavy loss.
A contented man is rarely disappointed.
He who knows when to stop does not find himself in trouble.
He will stay forever safe.

Stoicism 
The Christian practices of detachment derive from ancient Greek philosophy, most notably Stoicism. According to the Stoics, apatheia, which can be translated as equanimity,  was the quality that characterized the sage.

Whereas Aristotle had claimed that virtue was to be found in the golden mean between an excess and a deficiency of emotion (metriopatheia), the Stoics thought that living virtuously provided freedom from the passions, resulting in apatheia. It meant eradicating the tendency to react emotionally or egotistically to external events, the things that cannot be controlled. For Stoics, it was the optimally rational response to the world, for things cannot be controlled if they are caused by the will of others or by Nature; only one's own will can be controlled. That did not mean a loss of feeling, or total disengagement from the world. The Stoic who performs correct (virtuous) judgments and actions as part of the world order experiences contentment (eudaimonia) and good feelings (eupatheia).

References

Religious philosophical concepts